Joyner Clifford "Jo-Jo" White (June 1, 1909 – October 9, 1986) was an American center fielder in professional baseball. He played nine seasons with the Detroit Tigers (1932–38), Philadelphia Athletics (1943–44), and Cincinnati Reds (1944).  Born in Red Oak, Georgia, Joyner White was known as "Jo-Jo" because of the way he pronounced the name of his native state of Georgia.

The ,  White batted left-handed and threw right-handed. He began his playing career in minor league baseball in 1928 and after four full years of apprenticeship, he made the Tigers' roster at age 22 at the outset of the  season.

Outfielder for Tigers' 1934–35 champs

In 1934, he batted .313, scored 97 runs, and stole 28 bases—the second most in the American League.  His .418 on-base percentage was seventh best in the league.  He played in all seven games of the 1934 World Series, walking eight times and scoring six runs against the Gashouse Gang St. Louis Cardinals, who beat Detroit in seven games.

In 1935, White's batting average dropped 73 points to .240, but he still scored 82 runs and was among the AL leaders with 12 triples and 19 stolen bases.   He played in five games of the 1935 World Series, scoring three runs with a .417 on-base percentage.  White also hit a single in the 11th inning of Game 3 to drive in Marv Owen for the win, contributing to the Tigers' first-ever world championship, as they defeated the Chicago Cubs in six games.

White was roommates with Detroit slugger Hank Greenberg for five years.  In his autobiography, Greenberg wrote that they had a great relationship and enjoyed being on the road together, though they "used to fight the Civil War every night."  Greenberg noted that "no two people could be more different than me, coming from the Bronx, and Jo-Jo White, claiming he came from Atlanta."  White even confessed once to Greenberg, "I thought all you Jews had horns on your head."

Later playing career
In 1936, White lost the starting job in center field and remained a backup with the Tigers from 1936 to 1938.  After playing in only 55 games in the outfield in 1938, White was frustrated with his limited playing time.  After "a drink or two" on a train ride late in the  season, White "decided to attack" a brand new felt hat purchased by manager Del Baker.  Baker finally found out that it was White who had deliberately ruined the hat, and White was traded to the Seattle Rainiers of the Pacific Coast League on December 12 as part payment for young pitcher Fred Hutchinson.  White played for Seattle for four full seasons (1939–42), helping them win the PCL pennant in both 1940 and 1941.

White returned to the Major Leagues during World War II, following the depletion of the talent pool as top players went into military service.  In 1943, he was acquired by the Philadelphia Athletics and played in more games (139) and had more at bats (500) and hits (124) than any other season in his MLB career.  After playing 85 games for the A's in 1944, he was traded to the Cincinnati Reds in August, finishing his career by playing 24 games for the Reds. In nine MLB seasons, he had a lifetime batting average of .256 in 878 games, with 678 hits, 456 runs scored, 386 walks, 42 triples, and 92 stolen bases.

White's playing career did not end in 1944, however.  In 1945, he returned to the Pacific Coast League, and he had his finest pro season at age 36: 244 hits, 162 runs scored and a .355 batting average (all leading the PCL) while playing for the Sacramento Solons.  The following year, Sacramento sent White back to the Seattle Rainiers, where he made his managerial debut as a playing skipper late in the 1946 campaign.  White also managed the Rainiers from 1947 through mid-1949, leading them to the 1948 playoffs.  After his release in Seattle in 1949, he concluded his active career as a player only for the PCL Hollywood Stars, appearing in 31 games.

Coach and interim manager
He then had a long career as a scout, minor league manager and MLB coach, serving on the staffs of the Cleveland Indians (1958–60), Detroit Tigers (1960), Kansas City Athletics (1961–62), Milwaukee/Atlanta Braves (1963–66), and Kansas City Royals (1969), usually as third base coach.  He was a longtime associate of manager Joe Gordon, working with him with the Indians, Tigers, Athletics and Royals.

Indeed, as a coach under Gordon, White was involved in the bizarre trade of managers between the Indians and Tigers on August 3, 1960.  That day, the Indians' Gordon was swapped even-up for Tigers' manager Jimmy Dykes.  As the two pilots prepared to change teams, Cleveland needed an interim manager and tabbed White to handle the Indians for their night game with the Washington Senators at Griffith Stadium.  In White's only MLB game managed, he oversaw a 7–4 Indians' win.  Mudcat Grant hurled a complete game, supported by second baseman Ken Aspromonte's home run and three runs batted in.  Four days later, it was announced that White also "traded" teams—leaving the Indians to rejoin Gordon with Detroit, while Tigers' coach Luke Appling simultaneously quit his post to rejoin Dykes with the Indians.

White died at age 77 in Tacoma, Washington. He was inducted posthumously into the Georgia Sports Hall of Fame in 1997.

His son Mike White, a center fielder and second baseman, played in the Major Leagues for the Houston Colt .45s/Astros in 1963–65.

Managerial record

See also
 1935 Detroit Tigers season

References

External links

 Jo-Jo White at the Georgia Sports Hall of Fame 
 JoJo White at the Georgia Sports Hall of Fame
 

1909 births
1986 deaths
Atlanta Braves coaches
Baseball players from Georgia (U.S. state)
Beaumont Exporters players
Carrollton Frogs players
Cincinnati Reds players
Cleveland Indians coaches
Cleveland Indians scouts
Detroit Tigers coaches
Detroit Tigers players
Evansville Hubs players
Fort Smith Twins players
Hollywood Stars players
Kansas City Athletics coaches
Kansas City Royals coaches
Kansas City Royals scouts
Major League Baseball center fielders
Major League Baseball third base coaches
Milwaukee Braves coaches
Philadelphia Athletics players
Sacramento Solons players
San Antonio Missions managers
Seattle Rainiers players